Pointe is an international magazine aimed at ballet dancers and students. Releasing four times a year, Pointe covers international news on company debuts, competition results, and rising stars. Pointe also contains reviews, company profiles, a calendar of events, ballet-oriented shopping guides, and much other information regarding the dance world. Virginia Johnson, the artistic director of Dance Theatre of Harlem, was formerly Pointe editor-in-chief from its creation until 2009.

Macfadden Performing Arts Media acquired Pointe with the purchase of Lifestyle Media, Inc. in 2006. Macfadden's dance magazines were sold to Frederic M. Seegal, an investment banker with the Peter J. Solomon Company, in 2016.

Inside the magazine, there is an issue for every season and has information about dancers all over the world. The magazine was available as a yearly subscription. However, the company decided to cease publishing the Pointe magazine print edition. The Fall 2020 issue is the last issue of Pointe magazine subscribers will receive. The magazine covered everything from training and technique, careers, advice on how to audition for a professional dance job, health and body- including proper nutrition and wellness, guides about college dance, and auditions. There is also a section in the magazine that is called “Ask Amy” which includes all kinds of information asked by dancers like you to Amy Brandt the editor-in-Chief. Some examples of past articles within this section are; Ask Amy: Tips for squelching performance Nerves, Ask Amy: How can I find out which companies hire college grads, Ask Amy: How do I master quadruple turns or tips on how to start at a new studio.

This magazine marketed towards any competitive dancer or ballet student that wants to read the information regarding the dance world and might help them with their struggles while dancing. Amy Brandt is very creditable in the dance world due to her large repertoire of shows and companies she has been a part of. Along with Amy, four other editors put together the magazine: Raymond Mingst, Madeline Schrock, Cadence Neenan, and Lydia Murray.

References

External links
 
 "Pointe: The international Magazine of Ballet." Folio
 Virginia Johnson, acclaimed ballerina and editor-in-chief of Pointe magazine, will speak about her life in the world of dance
 Danza Ballet Article Featuring Pointe
 
 

Bimonthly magazines published in the United States
Dance magazines
Magazines established in 2000
Magazines published in New York City